Brahim is a given name. It is the Lebanese and Maghrebian pronunciation of Ibrahim, the Arabic name of the prophet and patriarch Abraham. 
Notable people with the name include:

Music
Brahim Attaeb (born 1984), better known by his mononym Brahim, Belgian R&B singer and presenter of Moroccan descent
Brahim Mahrez, better known by his mononym Brahim, French reggae and ragga artist of Algerian origin

Sports
Brahim Arafat Mezouar (born 1973), Algerian football player
Brahim Asloum (born 1979), French boxer and Olympic Gold medallist
Brahim Boulami (born 1972), Moroccan athlete who set two world records in the 3000 meters steeplechase
Brahim Boutayeb (born 1967), former Moroccan athlete and Olympic winner
Brahim Chettah (born 1980), Algerian long-distance runner
Brahim Díaz (born 1999), Spanish footballer
Brahim El Bahri (born 1986), Moroccan football midfielder
Brahim Ferradj (born 1987), French-born Algerian footballer
Brahim Hemdani (born 1978), French-born Algerian professional football player
Brahim Jabbour (born 1970), retired Moroccan long-distance runner who specialized in the 5000 metres
Brahim Kerrit (born 1940), former Tunisian football player
Brahim Lahlafi (born 1968), retired long-distance runner who represented Morocco
Brahim Taleb (born 1985), Moroccan long-distance runner who specializes in the 3000 metres steeplechase
Brahim Thiam (born 1974), Malian football (soccer) defender
Brahim Zaari (born 1989), Dutch footballer of Moroccan descent
Brahim Zafour (born 1977), Algerian football player
Brahim Zehhar (born 1935), Moroccan former footballer

Politics
Brahim Déby (1980–2007), the son of current Chadian President Idriss Déby
Brahim Dahane (born 1965), Sahrawi human rights activist and President of the Sahrawi Association of Victims of Grave Human Rights Violations Committed by the Moroccan State
Brahim Koulamallah, Chadian politician
Brahim Mojtar (born 1953), Sahrawi POLISARIO diplomatic
Brahim Yadel, citizen of France held in extrajudicial detention in the U.S. Guantanamo Bay detainment camps in Cuba
Joseph Brahim Seid (1927–1980), Chadian writer and politician
Brahim Gali (from 2016) President of The Sáhara Occidental (for the Polisario Front Party-Sahrawi Republicans)

Others
Brahim Akhiat (c. 1941–2018), Moroccan author
Brahim Takioullah (born 1982), Guinness World Records holder for the "World's largest feet"
Brahim Zniber (1920–2016), Moroccan businessman
Moulay Brahim (died 1661), Moroccan Sufi saint
Suliane Brahim (born 1978), French actress

See also
Mostefa Ben Brahim District, district of Sidi Bel Abbès Province, Algeria
My Brahim, town in Al Haouz Province, Marrakech-Tensift-Al Haouz, Morocco
Ouled Brahim District, district of Saïda Province, Algeria
Ouled Sidi Brahim, town and commune in Bordj Bou Arréridj Province, Algeria
Prix Mohamed Brahim Bouallou, Moroccan literary prize awarded to very short stories
Sidi Brahim (disambiguation)

Arabic masculine given names